Texas's 28th congressional district of the United States House of Representatives covers a strip in deep south Texas starting in the eastern outskirts of San Antonio, and ending at the U.S.–Mexico border. Towns entirely or partially within this district include Converse, Laredo, Rio Grande City, and Universal City. The current Representative from the 28th district is Henry Cuellar.

Election results from presidential races 
Results Under Current Lines (Since 2023)

List of members representing the district

Recent election results

2004 election

2006 election
On June 28, 2006, the U.S. Supreme Court declared that the Texas legislature's redistricting plan violated the Voting Rights Act in the case of Texas's 23rd congressional district. As a result, on August 4, 2006, a three-judge panel announced replacement district boundaries for 2006 election for the 23rd district, which affected the boundaries of the 15th, 21st, 25th and 28th districts.

On election day in November, these five districts had open primaries, or a "jungle primary"; any candidate to receive more than 50% of the vote wins the seat. Otherwise, a runoff election in December will decide the seat.

Cuellar retained his seat in the 28th district.

2008 election

2010 election

2012 election

2014 election

2016 election

2018 election

2020 election

2022 election

See also
List of United States congressional districts

References

 Congressional Biographical Directory of the United States 1774–present

Laredo, Texas
28